Lumber City is a census-designated place located in Brown Township, Mifflin County in the state of Pennsylvania, United States.  It is located just off US 322 in central Mifflin County, very close to the community of Reedsville.  As of the 2010 census, the population was 255 residents.

References

Populated places in Mifflin County, Pennsylvania